Owen James Hart (May 7, 1965 – May 23, 1999) was a Canadian-American professional wrestler who worked for several promotions including Stampede Wrestling, New Japan Pro-Wrestling (NJPW), World Championship Wrestling (WCW), and the World Wrestling Federation (WWF). He received most of his success in the WWF, where he wrestled under both his own name and the ring name The Blue Blazer.

A member of the Hart wrestling family, he was born in Calgary, Alberta, the youngest of twelve children of Stampede Wrestling promoters Stu and Helen Hart. Among other accolades, Owen was a one-time USWA Unified World Heavyweight Champion, a two-time WWF Intercontinental Champion, a one-time WWF European Champion, and a four-time WWF World Tag Team Champion, as well as the 1994 WWF King of the Ring. He headlined multiple pay-per-view events for the WWF, and was widely regarded as one of the company's best in-ring performers.

Hart died on May 23, 1999, during his entrance from the rafters of Kemper Arena in Kansas City, Missouri, United States. The equipment that was lowering him to the ring malfunctioned and he fell to his death in front of a live audience and live on Pay Per View during WWF's Over the Edge event.

Early life 
Owen was born on May 7, 1965, in Calgary, Alberta into the Hart wrestling family and was the youngest child of Stu and Helen Hart. He grew up in a household with eleven older siblings: Smith, Bruce, Keith, Wayne, Dean, Ellie, Georgia, Bret, Alison, Ross and Diana.

He was of Greek descent through his maternal grandmother and Irish through his maternal grandfather. His father was mainly of Scots-Irish descent, but also had Scottish and German ancestry.

Because his mother, Helen, was born in New York, Hart held American citizenship in addition to Canadian citizenship, which he acquired due to birth in Canada to a Canadian-born father.

Professional wrestling career

Early career (1983–1988) 
Hart first gained wrestling experience in the amateur wrestling division at high school, through which he met his wife, Martha. Hart continued amateur wrestling for the Dinos at the University of Calgary.  He placed 4th at the 1984 Canada West championships in the 76 kg weight class. Wrestling was not Hart's first choice for a career; as Martha explained in her book Broken Harts, Owen tried numerous times to find a profitable living outside of wrestling. Owen is quoted as saying, in the WWE Home Video "Owen Hart of Gold" that "during his time in the University, he wrestled incognito (under a mask) as the original British Bulldog. Then, after he graduated from the University, he wrestled as "Bronco" Owen Hart at Royal Albert Hall in London, England. As those attempts were unsuccessful, Hart was trained in his father's Hart Dungeon and worked for his father's federation, Stampede Wrestling and in England for Max Crabtree's Joint Promotions in matches that got broadcast on ITV's World of Sport. He remained with Stampede for the next couple of years while honing his skills. During 1986, Hart teamed with Ben Bassarab and won the Stampede Wrestling International Tag Team Championship. The success of the team and Hart's in-ring skills earned him Pro Wrestling Illustrateds Rookie of the Year Award in 1987. After he and Bassarab lost the tag team title, he feuded with Johnny Smith and Dynamite Kid.

In 1987, Hart branched out to Japan where he wrestled for New Japan Pro-Wrestling (NJPW) on several tours. In NJPW, he wrestled Keiichi Yamada, both before and after he debuted the Jushin Liger gimmick. On May 27, 1988, Hart defeated Hiroshi Hase for the IWGP Junior Heavyweight Championship, becoming the first non-Japanese wrestler to win the title. His reign would end nearly a month later, as he lost the title to Shiro Koshinaka on June 24, 1988.

World Wrestling Federation (1988–1989) 
Hart's success in Japan and Stampede's working relationship with the World Wrestling Federation led to Hart signing with the company in the summer of 1988. Instead of promoting Owen as Bret Hart's younger brother, the WWF decided to create a masked "superhero" type gimmick for him which played to his high-flying style. He broke into the WWF as The Blue Blazer (initially The Blue Angel), with his early appearances seeing him defeat the likes of Terry Gibbs, Steve Lombardi and Barry Horowitz. The Blue Blazer made his pay-per-view debut at Survivor Series '88, teaming with The Ultimate Warrior, Brutus Beefcake, Jim Brunzell and Sam Houston against The Honky Tonk Man, Greg Valentine, Outlaw Ron Bass, Bad News Brown and Dangerous Danny Davis. The Blazer was eliminated by Valentine, but his team went on to win the match. He continued to wrestle in the midcard, defeating enhancement talent but often falling short against other name talent; he lost to Ted DiBiase on the March 11, 1989 Saturday Night's Main Event XX and was defeated by Mr. Perfect at WrestleMania V.

Various promotions (1989–1991) 
Shortly after WrestleMania, Hart left the WWF to tour the world both with and without the Blue Blazer gimmick. He also returned to Stampede, until it shut down in December 1989. In 1991, Hart lost the Blue Blazer mask in a mascara contra mascara match against Mexican wrestler El Canek, and would not utilize the gimmick again until 1998.

He also returned to New Japan Pro-Wrestling (NJPW). In 1990 he went to Germany and worked Catch Wrestling Association.

Hart debuted in World Championship Wrestling's self-titled TV show on March 16, 1991, the first of five TV matches he competed in, all of which were against preliminary talent such as Mark Kyle. One of the bouts saw him team with Ricky Morton.

World Wrestling Federation (1991–1999)

The New Foundation; High Energy (1991–1993) 

Hart had been engaged in contract discussions with WCW but the deal was never struck, as Owen was not willing to move himself and his family to the company's headquarters in Atlanta. Instead, he signed with the WWF for a second time. In the WWF the popular Hart Foundation, composed of his brother Bret and real-life brother-in-law Jim Neidhart, had split up; Bret set out on a singles career while Neidhart was used sparingly. When Neidhart returned from a storyline injury, he joined Owen to form a team known as The New Foundation. Owen and Neidhart first feuded with the Beverly Brothers. They then had their only pay-per-view match at the Royal Rumble in January 1992 where they beat The Orient Express. Neidhart left the WWF shortly afterward, and Hart set out on a very short run as a singles wrestler, including a victorious match at WrestleMania VIII when he faced off against Skinner. Shortly after WrestleMania, Hart was teamed up with Koko B. Ware to form the duo known as High Energy. They had only one pay-per-view match as a team, at the Survivor Series where they lost to The Headshrinkers. The team was quietly dropped at the start of 1993 with Hart starting a singles career.  Owen suffered a knee injury on March 9, 1993, in a match taped for Superstars, against Bam Bam Bigelow, which kept him sidelined for nearly two months.

Feud with Bret Hart (1993–1995) 

In the middle of 1993, when Bret Hart's feud with Jerry Lawler ignited, Owen stood by his brother's side and fought against Lawler in the United States Wrestling Association where most of the WWF talent were considered the heels. Owen won the USWA Unified World Heavyweight Championship from Papa Shango. Owen's participation in the WWF vs. USWA feud was cut short when he suffered a knee injury in the summer of 1993 and was forced to take some time away from the ring.

Hart returned to the WWF ring in the fall of 1993, at a time when Bret's feud with Lawler was temporarily sidetracked. Bret, along with Owen and their brothers Bruce and Keith, were scheduled to face Lawler and his team at Survivor Series. However, Lawler was unable to make it to the show, and as a result could not appear on WWF television. Lawler was replaced with Shawn Michaels. During the match Owen and Bret inadvertently crashed into each other, causing Owen to be eliminated from the team. Owen showed up after the match and had a heated confrontation with Bret, while Keith, Bruce and Stu tried to calm things down. This confrontation resulted in Owen leaving the ring to boos while his brothers and father watched in dismay and mother Helen cried at ringside. The following night Owen adopted the pink and black tights, sunglasses and Sharpshooter finisher to send a message to his brother. Owen, angry with being in Bret's shadow, challenged his brother which Bret declined. Instead the brothers seemed to reunite by the holidays.

Bret tried to make amends with Owen, teaming with him on a regular basis. Bret even secured the two a shot at the WWF Tag Team Championship. They faced the Quebecers for the title at the Royal Rumble in January 1994. Initially everything was fine between the brothers, but when Bret hurt his knee (kayfabe) and was unable to tag Owen in for a long period of time, the younger Hart got frustrated. When the referee stopped the match due to Bret's damaged knee, Owen snapped; he kicked his brother in the knee and then walked off, berating Bret on the Titantron shortly after as Bret was being helped backstage. This started his run as a heel. After the act, an infuriated Owen accused his brother of being selfish and holding him down. Owen admitted that it felt good to take out his brother. The two brothers faced off for the first time at WrestleMania X, where Owen cleanly pinned his older brother. Later in the evening, Bret won the WWF Championship while Owen stood by and watched in jealousy as Bret celebrated in the ring. Owen won the 1994 King of the Ring tournament turning back Razor Ramon in the finals with an elbow drop to the back and with an assist from Jim Neidhart. After the victory, Owen dropped "The Rocket" nickname and took the nickname "The King of Harts."

Owen and Bret feuded throughout the summer of 1994, clashing many times both in singles and later in tag team matches (with Bret joined by the returning British Bulldog). Two prominent matches took place in this feud: first, their steel cage match in the co-main event of SummerSlam for Bret's WWF Championship, which Bret won. This match later received a five-star rating from Dave Meltzer. The second was a lumberjack match on August 17 that Owen initially won and was announced as WWF Champion; Bret won the match after it was ordered to continue due to interference. At the Survivor Series, Owen struck the most damaging blow against his brother as he conned his own mother Helen to throw in the towel for Bret. The ploy cost Bret the WWF Championship to Bob Backlund. Owen also prevented Bret from regaining the WWF Championship at the Royal Rumble in 1995 when he interfered in the match between Bret and new champion Diesel. In the weeks after the Royal Rumble, Bret and Owen clashed again with Bret soundly defeating his brother, thus putting an end to their feud for the time being.

Camp Cornette; Tag Team Champion (1995–1997) 

Owen rebounded from the loss to Bret by winning the WWF Tag Team Championship from The Smoking Gunns at WrestleMania XI. Owen, who was joined by a "Mystery Partner", had challenged the Gunns to a title match; the partner turned out to be former world champion Yokozuna. After the victory Owen took Jim Cornette and Mr. Fuji as his managers, who already managed Yokozuna. The team defended the title for five months until they lost them to Shawn Michaels and Diesel at In Your House 3. They would briefly hold the title a second time when the belts were handed back to them before the Smoking Gunns regained the title. Owen and Yokozuna would continue to team off and on until the end of the year.

In 1995, Owen's brother-in-law Davey Boy Smith turned heel and joined the Camp Cornette stable. During the summer of 1996 the two brothers in law started to team up more and more, sometimes alongside Vader who was also a member of Camp Cornette. Owen also won a Slammy Award for injuring Shawn Michaels and began using the nickname "Slammy Award Winner" and the "King of Harts" nickname was rarely used, Owen was also a color commentator for the 1996 King of the Ring (exhibiting clear partisan support for Vader and Smith) and during this time wore a cast on his right forearm for several months, feigning a nagging injury to subsequently use his cast as a weapon during his matches.

In September 1996, Bulldog and Hart earned a pay-per-view shot at the tag team titles at In Your House 10. Owen and Bulldog left with the gold after defeating the Smoking Gunns. They also left with a new manager as Clarence Mason had conned Jim Cornette into signing over the contracts of the new champions. Signs of dissension, however, slowly started to show. One occasion where this was evident was at the Royal Rumble when Hart accidentally eliminated Bulldog. After the Rumble, they had miscommunication in matches against Doug Furnas and Phil LaFon and Bulldog fired Mason after losing a match to Crush who was also managed by Mason, something which did not sit well with Hart. Another bone of contention between the two was the newly created WWF European Championship; both men had fought their way to the finals to crown the first champion with Bulldog coming out as the victor.

After retaining the tag team title against the Headbangers by disqualification on the edition of March 24, 1997 of Monday Night Raw, the tension between the two bubbled over. An incensed Hart demanded a shot at Bulldog's European title the next week. The match was booked for March 31; on the night, the two went at it with such intensity that many thought the tag team champions had finally gone their separate ways. Then in a shocking moment, the recently turned heel Bret Hart appeared at ringside and stopped the match. Bret appealed to both Owen and Bulldog, talking about the importance of family. They agreed to put their differences aside and join with Bret to form the new Hart Foundation, an anti-American stable that also included Hart in-law Jim Neidhart and Hart family friend Brian Pillman.

Hart Foundation (1997) 

After forming the Hart Foundation, Owen quickly gained singles gold of his own as he pinned Rocky Maivia to win his first WWF Intercontinental Championship. This meant that the Hart Foundation held every WWF title except the WWF Championship, cementing their dominance over the federation. It was not all success for Owen, though, as he and the British Bulldog lost the WWF Tag Team Championship to Stone Cold Steve Austin and Shawn Michaels on May 26, 1997. He began feuding with Austin shortly thereafter.

Owen and Bulldog got a second chance at regaining the tag team titles after Michaels vacated his half of the championship due to an injury. On the edition of July 14, 1997 of Raw the two entered a tournament and won to face Austin and a partner of his choice that evening for the vacant titles. That partner turned out to be Dude Love, who declared himself to be Austin's partner and helped him defeat Hart and Bulldog for the tag team championship.

At SummerSlam in August, Hart was to defend his Intercontinental Championship against Austin in a "Kiss My Ass" match, where Hart put the title up against Austin having to kiss his buttocks if he lost. During the match, Hart botched a piledriver and dropped Austin on the top of his head, injuring his neck. Austin won the title from Hart that evening, but due to the injury was forced to vacate the title. Although the entire situation was an accident, the WWF decided to make it part of the storyline as Owen began wearing a T-shirt patterned after Austin's that read "Owen 3:16/I Just Broke Your Neck". Hart was then entered into a tournament to crown a new champion.

Hart fought his way to the finals of the tournament to crown the next Intercontinental Champion and was set to face Faarooq at Badd Blood: In Your House. Owen beat Faarooq with Austin's help. Afterward, Austin explained that he wanted to beat Hart for the title when he returned and would not allow Faarooq or anyone else to beat him. After Hart retained the title twice by disqualification between Bad Blood and Survivor Series in Montreal, Austin got his wish and defeated Hart for the Intercontinental Championship again. Later that night, the Montreal Screwjob took place. Bret left the WWF after Survivor Series and both the British Bulldog and Jim Neidhart were granted quick releases from their contracts to jump to WCW. This left Owen as the only Hart family member remaining in the WWF, due to his contractual obligations.

The Black Hart; Nation of Domination (1997–1998) 

Hart was not seen or mentioned on WWF programming until he made a surprise appearance after Shawn Michaels retained his title following a disqualification loss to Ken Shamrock at In Your House: D-Generation X where he attacked Shawn Michaels. Now a fan favourite, but with a new edgy, antisocial attitude, Hart became known as "The Lone Hart" and also "The Black Hart". Owen had a feud with D-Generation X (DX) and challenged Shawn Michaels for the WWF Championship on the December 29, 1997 episode of Raw Is War: Hart had Michaels locked in the Sharpshooter when Triple H interfered in order to save Michaels' title, giving Hart the victory by disqualification. He later won the European title from Triple H, although not directly. Goldust dressed up as Triple H in an attempt to swerve Hart, but Commissioner Slaughter considered him to be a legitimate replacement. Hart later suffered a kayfabe ankle injury during a match against Barry Windham involving Triple H. When Hart joined the commentary at ringside, Triple H managed to draw Owen into an impromptu title match and regained the title. Chyna interfered while the referee wasn't looking and while Triple H was distracting the referee, she struck Hart behind the left knee with a baseball bat, picked him up and threw him back into the ring where Triple H put Hart in a reverse ankle lock to his injured right ankle to win the European Championship under referees discretion in controversial fashion.

Four weeks after WrestleMania, during a tag team match with Ken Shamrock against Mark Henry and Rocky Maivia (later known as The Rock), Hart turned on Shamrock, "snapping" his ankle and "biting his ear" in the process, and becoming a heel once again. After the attack on Shamrock, Hart became the co-leader, with The Rock, of the Nation of Domination, claiming that "Enough is enough and it's time for a change". The Nation's first big feud after Hart joined was against DX. It was during this feud that D-Generation X parodied the Nation of Domination. The imitation was complete with an actor dressing up as Hart and uttering the phrase "I am not a nugget"; this was in response to Shawn Michaels referring to Owen as a nugget of feces in a toilet bowl that, no matter how many times Michaels flushed, he was unable to get rid of. "Nugget" became a derisive term that followed Hart for the rest of his career. Hart's participation in the DX feud was sidetracked when Shamrock returned from injuries dead set on getting revenge on Hart. The two split a pair of specialty matches on pay-per-view, but nothing was ever conclusively settled between them.

Teaming with Jeff Jarrett; the Blue Blazer (1998–1999) 
Hart remained with the Nation throughout the year until the stable slowly dissolved. After SummerSlam, he teamed with Jeff Jarrett. Hart and Jarrett had Jarrett's manager Debra in their corner. During this time a storyline was proposed that Hart was supposed to have an on-screen affair with Debra, something which Owen turned down.

After a match in which Hart "accidentally injured" Dan Severn, Hart seemingly quit the WWF. Playing off the legitimate injury Hart had inflicted on Austin the year before, the angle blurred the lines between reality and "storyline". Yet as soon as Hart "quit", the Blue Blazer appeared in the WWF claiming to in no way be Hart despite it being very obvious who was under the mask. Unlike the first run of the character, the Blazer was now an overbearing, self-righteous heel who treated the edgy Attitude Era WWF with disdain. Hart and Jarrett ended up making the storyline comical. To prove that Hart was not the Blazer, he showed up beside the Blue Blazer, who was a masked Jarrett. In a later attempt to prove that neither Hart or Jarrett was the Blazer, they both appeared next to a man in the Blue Blazer mask; however, it was obvious that a black man was under the mask (Hart's former tag team partner Koko B. Ware). On January 25, 1999, in the midst of the Blue Blazer angle Hart and Jarrett defeated Ken Shamrock and The Big Boss Man for the WWF Tag Team Championship. The pair successfully defended the belts against Test and D'Lo Brown at WrestleMania XV. They lost the titles to the team of Kane and X-Pac on the (pre-taped) episode of Raw that aired on April 5, 1999. However, Hart and Jarrett continued to team together until Hart's death in May during the Over the Edge pay-per-view event.

Personal life 
Hart met Martha Joan Patterson in 1982. They married on July 1, 1989 and had two children together: Oje Edward Hart (born March 5, 1992) and Athena Christie Hart (born September 23, 1995).

On May 28, 2011, Hart was inducted into the Legends Pro Wrestling "Hall of Fame" by Jack Blaze in Wheeling, West Virginia at their "LPW Hart & Soul Tour" event. The award was accepted by his brother-in-law Jim Neidhart, who was also inducted that night.

Death

Over the Edge 1999 

On May 23, 1999, Hart fell to his death in Kansas City, Missouri, during the Over the Edge pay-per-view event. Hart was in the process of being lowered via harness and grapple line into the ring from the rafters of Kemper Arena for a booked Intercontinental Championship match against The Godfather. In keeping with the Blazer's new "buffoonish superhero" character, he was to begin a dramatic entrance, being lowered to just above ring level, at which time he would act "entangled", then release himself from the safety harness and fall flat on his face for comedic effect—this necessitated the use of a quick release mechanism. It was an elaboration on a Blue Blazer stunt done previously on the Sunday Night Heat before Survivor Series in 1998. While being lowered into the ring, Hart fell 78 feet (24 m), landing chest-first on the top rope (approximately a foot from the nearest turnbuckle), throwing him into the ring.

Hart had performed the stunt only a few times before. Hart's widow Martha has suggested that, by moving around to get comfortable with both the harness and his cape on, Hart unintentionally triggered an early release. Television viewers did not see the incident. During the fall, a pre-taped vignette was being shown on the pay-per-view broadcast as well as on the monitors in the darkened arena. Afterward, while Hart was being worked on by medical personnel inside the ring, the live event's broadcast showed only the audience. Meanwhile, WWF television announcer Jim Ross repeatedly told those watching live on pay-per-view that what had just transpired was not a wrestling angle or storyline and that Hart was hurt badly, emphasizing the seriousness of the situation. Hart was transported to Truman Medical Center in Kansas City. While several attempts to revive him were made, he died due to his injuries. The cause of death was later revealed to be internal bleeding from blunt force trauma. The impact severed his aorta, resulting in Hart bleeding to death just minutes later; he was 34 years old.

Controversy 
WWF management controversially chose to continue the event. Later, Jim Ross announced the death of Hart to the home viewers during the pay-per-view, but not to the crowd in the arena. While the event went on, it has never been released commercially by WWF Home Video. In 2014, fifteen years after his death, the WWE Network aired the event for the first time. A small photo tribute is shown before the start informing fans that Hart died during the original broadcast. All footage of Hart was edited out of the event. The statement reads: "In Memory of Owen Hart May 7, 1965 – May 23, 1999 who accidentally passed away during this broadcast."

In the decades that followed Hart's death, much attention was focused on the harness Hart used that night, especially on the "quick release" trigger and safety latches. When someone is lowered from the rafters in a harness, there are backup latches that must be latched for safety purposes.  Four weeks after the event, the Hart family sued the WWF over how dangerous and poorly planned the stunt was, and that the harness system was defective. After over a year and a half into the case, a settlement was reached on November 2, 2000, which saw the WWF pay the Hart family US$18 million. The manufacturer of the harness system was also a defendant against the Hart family, but they were dismissed from the case after the settlement was reached. Martha used millions of the settlement to establish the Owen Hart Foundation. Martha wrote a book about Hart's life in 2002 called Broken Harts: The Life and Death of Owen Hart.

In his DVD set, Bret Hart said that he wishes he had been with the WWF the night Owen's accident happened, as he would have discouraged his brother from performing the stunt.

Aftermath 

A special episode of Raw Is War that aired on May 24, 1999, the night after Hart's death, was dubbed Raw Is Owen. It was broadcast live from the Kiel Center in St. Louis. It included shoot interviews from his fellow wrestlers. According to Raw Exposed (a special that aired upon Raw returning to USA Network on October 3, 2005), all storylines and rivalries were put aside, and WWF management gave all wrestlers on the roster the option of working or not. Nevertheless, ten matches were booked with no angles.

The show began with all the wrestlers, managers, referees and agents of the WWF (except WWF Champion The Undertaker and Kane – both as a means to keep kayfabe) standing on the entrance ramp. Howard Finkel called for a ten-bell salute. A tribute video narrated by Vince McMahon then played on the Titantron. Throughout the broadcast, personal thoughts on Hart in the form of shoot interviews with various WWF wrestlers were played. Hart's former Nation of Domination comrades were emotional, most notably Mark Henry, who wept as he read a poem that he wrote in memory of Hart. Before the first commercial break, such thoughts were aired from Mick Foley and Bradshaw. Foley said that Hart was his son's favourite wrestler and had proudly gotten a haircut like Owen's, although he also said his son did not quite understand that "nugget" was not a term of endearment.

Bradshaw talked about how Hart spent less money on the road than most wrestlers because he wanted to retire early and spend time with his family. Owen's friend and Nation of Domination partner The Rock also made a short speech before engaging in a short match against Val Venis. Test then spoke about a rib Owen pulled on him. The broadcast ended with Stone Cold Steve Austin coming out for a special salute to Hart by climbing the turnbuckle and performing his famous "beer-bash" routine, ending with him giving a toast to Owen (whose picture was displayed on the Titantron throughout the entire show) and leaving one beer in the ring (for Owen). The tribute show scored a 7.2 Nielsen rating, making it the highest-rated special episode in Raw history and the third highest-rated episode of Raw overall. Shawn Michaels, in his Heartbreak and Triumph autobiography, notes that "Owen is the only guy you could have a two-hour show for, and no-one would say a bad word about him." The next day, WWF taped the episode of Raw for May 31, 1999. During that show, Jeff Jarrett defeated The Godfather to win the WWF Intercontinental Championship, the title Hart was booked to win for a third time at Over the Edge. Celebrating his victory, Jarrett screamed Hart's name.

On October 4, 1999, five months after Owen's death, Bret Hart faced Chris Benoit on WCW Nitro in a tribute to his brother. The match took place in the same arena in which Owen had fallen to his death.

In 2017, Ross referred to Hart's death as the single most shocking moment he had ever witnessed in wrestling.

Legacy 
Hart was widely regarded as one of the best in-ring performers in the WWE; Fox Sports dubbed him a "genius". He would go on to be considered one of the greatest professional wrestlers of all time by many industry colleagues.

In 2001, Hart's sister Diana released her first book named Under the Mat which dealt with their family. The book was written partially in response to Owen's death and became very controversial. Owen's widow Martha Hart pursued legal action over the work and claimed that Diana made inaccurate and irresponsible statements about her and her family. She stated that the book was "filled with distortions, misstatements and unjustified slurs that attempt to destroy the reputation of my family and me, and undermine the memory of Owen."

In June 2010, Martha filed a lawsuit against the WWE over WWE's use of Owen's name and likeness as well as personal photos of Hart's family in the Hart & Soul WWE DVD, as well as the failure to make royalty payments. The matter was scheduled to go to trial in June 2013 before the settlement was reached in April 2013 for an undisclosed amount.

The WWE released Owen: Hart of Gold on DVD and Blu-ray on December 7, 2015 in the United Kingdom, with the United States release the day after.

The season two finale of Dark Side of the Ring revealed details about Owen's wrestling career, legacy and death.

WWE wrestler Kevin Owens named his son after Hart and incorporated the name into his own ring name as tribute to both of them.

During Mark Henry's WWE Hall of Fame induction in 2018, Henry asked Martha Hart to allow her late husband to be inducted into the Hall of Fame. Martha has been critical of the WWE Hall of Fame, stating: "They don't even have a Hallway of Fame. It doesn't exist. There's nothing. It's a fake entity. There's nothing real or tangible. It's just an event they have to make money. They put it on TV and have a celebration, and it's just so ridiculous. I would never even entertain it. It's garbage."

On September 20, 2021, All Elite Wrestling (AEW) announced the Owen Hart Cup Tournament, in partnership with the Owen Hart Foundation, wherein the winner will receive a trophy called "The Owen". The company also announced production and distribution of original Owen Hart merchandise and Hart as a character in AEW's upcoming console game, AEW Fight Forever.

Championships and accomplishments 

 George Tragos/Lou Thesz Professional Wrestling Hall of Fame
 Class of 2018 (Posthumous Inductee)
 Legends Pro Wrestling
 LPW Hall of Fame (Class of 2011)
 Prairie Wrestling Alliance
 Prairie Wrestling Alliance Hall of Fame (Class of 2010)
 New Japan Pro-Wrestling
 IWGP Junior Heavyweight Championship (1 time)
 Pro Wrestling Illustrated
 Editor's Award (1999)
 Feud of the Year (1994) 
 Rookie of the Year (1987)
 Ranked No. 10 of the top 500 singles wrestlers in the PWI 500 in 1994
 Ranked No. 66 of the top 500 singles wrestlers of the "PWI Years" in 2003
 Ranked No. 84 of the top 100 tag teams of the "PWI Years" in 2003 – with Davey Boy Smith
Professional Wrestling Hall of Fame
Class of 2019
 Pro Wrestling This Week
 Wrestler of the Week (July 5–11, 1987)
Canadian Wrestling Hall of Fame
Individually
 With the Hart family
 Stampede Wrestling
 Stampede British Commonwealth Mid-Heavyweight Championship (1 time)
 Stampede Wrestling International Tag Team Championship (1 time) – with Ben Bassarab
 Stampede North American Heavyweight Championship (2 times)
 Stampede Wrestling Hall of Fame (Class of 1995)
 United States Wrestling Association
 USWA Unified World Heavyweight Championship (1 time)
 World Wrestling Federation
 WWF European Championship (1 time)
 WWF Intercontinental Championship (2 times)
 WWF Tag Team Championship (4 times) – with Yokozuna (2), The British Bulldog (1) and Jeff Jarrett (1)
 King of the Ring (1994)
 Madison Square Garden Royal Rumble (1994)
WWF World Tag Team Championship Tournament (1997) – with The British Bulldog
WWF Intercontinental Championship Tournament (1997)
 Slammy Award (3 times)
 Biggest Rat (1994)
 Squared Circle Shocker (1996)
 Best Bow Tie (1997)
 Wrestling Observer Newsletter
 Best Flying Wrestler (1987, 1988)
 Feud of the Year (1997)

Luchas de Apuestas record

See also 
 Deaths in sports
 Hart wrestling family
 List of premature professional wrestling deaths

Notes

References

Further reading

External links 

 
 Owen Hart's Funeral
 Bret Hart column mentioning he and Owen holding dual citizenship at the Wayback Machine (archived March 5, 2016)

1965 births
1999 deaths
Accidental deaths from falls
Accidental deaths in Missouri
American male professional wrestlers
American sportspeople of Canadian descent
American people of English descent
American people of Greek descent
American people of Scotch-Irish descent
Canadian male professional wrestlers
Canadian people of American descent
Canadian people of English descent
Canadian people of Greek descent
Canadian people of Ulster-Scottish descent
Expatriate professional wrestlers in Japan
Filmed deaths in sports
Hart family members
IWGP Junior Heavyweight champions
Masked wrestlers
Professional wrestlers from Calgary
Professional wrestling deaths
Professional Wrestling Hall of Fame and Museum
Sports deaths in Missouri
Stampede Wrestling alumni
Stampede Wrestling British Commonwealth Mid-Heavyweight Champions
Stampede Wrestling International Tag Team Champions
Stampede Wrestling North American Heavyweight Champions
The Hart Foundation members
The Nation of Domination members
USWA Unified World Heavyweight Champions
WWF European Champions
WWF/WWE Intercontinental Champions
WWF/WWE King Crown's Champions/King of the Ring winners